Sidney Harris, a.k.a. S. Harris, is an American cartoonist who draws cartoons about science, mathematics, and technology.

About
He was born in Brooklyn, New York on May 8, 1933, and has been drawing science-related cartoons at least since 1955. His cartoons have appeared in the scientific journals, science fiction magazines and textbooks.  He was elected as the 19th honorary member of Sigma Xi, a scientific honor society, in 1997. Harris obtained his degree from Brooklyn College and then attended the Art Students League in New York. He began his career as a science cartoonist in 1955. Over 600 of Harris' drawings have been published by American Scientist since the 1970s. Harris also has had more than 20 cartoon collections published.

Appearances
Harris's cartoons have appeared the publications Science, Current Contents, Discover, Physics Today, The New Yorker, The Wall Street Journal, Harvard Business Review, The Chronicle of Higher Education, Chicago, Playboy and National Lampoon. Harris has a traveling exhibit, created by Sigma Xi and the New York Hall of Science, to appear in local museums.

Bibliography
 What's So Funny About Science? (1977) 
 Chicken Soup and Other Medical Matters (1979)
 All Ends Up: Cartoons from American Scientist (1980)
 What's So Funny About Computers (1983)
 Science Goes to the Dogs (1985)
 You Want Proof? I'll Give You Proof! More Cartoons from Sidney Harris (1990)
 Can't You Guys Read? Cartoons on Academia (1991)
 Chalk Up Another One: The Best of Sidney Harris (1992) 
 From Personal Ads to Cloning Labs: More Science Cartoons from Sidney Harris (1992)
 So Sue Me! Cartoons on the Law (1993)
 Stress Test: Cartoons on Medicine (1994)
 What's So Funny About Business? Yuppies, Bosses, and other Capitalists (1995)
 There Goes the Neighborhood: Cartoons on the Environment (1996)
 Einstein Atomized: More Science Cartoons (1996)
 The Interactive Toaster: Cartoons on Business (1996)
 Freudian Slips: Cartoons on Psychology (1997)
 49 Dogs, 36 Cats and a Platypus: Animal Cartoons (2000) 
 Einstein Simplified: Cartoons on Science (2004) 
 101 Funny Things About Global Warming (2007) 
 Aside From The Cockroach, How Was Everything? Cartoons on the Dangers of Eating (2013)

References

External links 

American cartoonists
Living people
1933 births
Brooklyn College alumni
The Magazine of Fantasy & Science Fiction people
The New Yorker cartoonists
The New Yorker people